Brigita Schmögnerová (born 17 November 1947) is a Slovak economist and politician. She was the Minister of Finance of Slovakia from 1998 to 2002 under Prime Minister Mikuláš Dzurinda. She was appointed Executive Secretary of the United Nations Economic Commission for Europe in 2002.

Schmögnerová led the country's accession to the euro, which earned her the nickname of the "Iron lady of Slovakia".

References

1947 births
Living people
Politicians from Bratislava
Finance ministers of Slovakia
University of Economics in Bratislava alumni
Party of the Democratic Left (Slovakia) politicians
Members of the National Council (Slovakia) 1994-1998
Female finance ministers
20th-century Slovak women politicians
21st-century Slovak women politicians
21st-century Slovak politicians
Women government ministers of Slovakia
Female members of the National Council (Slovakia)